Elections to the Legislative Assembly of the Indian state of Travancore-Cochin were held on 27 March 1952.

Constituencies
Travancore-Cochin had 97 constituencies, 11 of them were two-member constituencies and 86 were single-member constituencies. There were 33,65,955 electors in the single member constituencies, while 8,44,389 electors in two-member constituencies. Total 437 candidates competed for 108 seats of the 97 constituencies in the Assembly.

Political parties
Three national parties (Indian National Congress, Revolutionary Socialist Party and Socialist Party) along with four state parties (Cochin Party, Travancore Cochin Republican Praja Party, Travancore Tamil Nadu Congress and Tamil Nadu Toilers Party) and two registered unrecognized party (Kerala Socialist Party and  Tamil Nadu People Front) took part in the electoral process of 1951-1952 assembly elections. Since Communist Party of India was banned in Travancore-Cochin State, its candidates took part in the electoral process as Independent candidates, which later formed a United Left front of leftists following the success in the elections.

Results
Congress party fell short of the majority by 11 seats. So it formed a coalition government with the help of Travancore Tamil Nadu Congress, Kerala Socialist Party and a Nominated member.

!colspan=8|
|- style="background-color:#E9E9E9; text-align:center;"
! class="unsortable" |
! Political party !! Flag !! Seats  Contested !! Won !! % of  Seats !! Votes !! Vote %
|- style="background: #90EE90;"
| 
| 
| 105 || 44 || 40.74 || 12,04,364 || 35.44
|-
| 
|
| 70 || 11 || 10.19 || 4,85,194 || 14.28
|- style="background: #90EE90;"
|
|
| 15 || 8 || 7.41 || 2,01,118 || 5.92
|-
|
|
| 12 || 1 || 0.93 || 59,535 || 1.75
|-
|
| 
| 11 || 6 || 5.56 || 1,18,333 || 3.48
|- style="background: #90EE90;"
|
|
| 10 || 1 || 0.93 || 73,981 || 2.18
|-
| 
|
| 199 || 37 || 34.26 || 11,51,555 || 33.89
|- class="unsortable" style="background-color:#E9E9E9"
! colspan = 3| Total seats
! 108 !! style="text-align:center;" |Voters !! 50,54,733 !! style="text-align:center;" |Turnout !! 33,98,193 (67.23%)
|}

Elected members

See also

 Travancore-Cochin
 1951–52 elections in India
 1952 Madras Legislative Assembly election in Malabar
 1954 Travancore-Cochin Legislative Assembly election

References

State Assembly elections in Kerala
travancore-Cochin
Travancore–Cochin
March 1952 events in Asia